Soldier is an unincorporated community in Camas County, Idaho, United States.

References

Unincorporated communities in Camas County, Idaho
Unincorporated communities in Idaho